The 2008 World Jiu-Jitsu Championship was held at California State University in Long Beach, California, United States.

Results

Academy Results

Men's Black Belt

Women's Brown/Black Belt

External links 
 World Jiu-Jitsu Championship

References

World Jiu-Jitsu Championship